Maxims of equity are legal maxims that serve as a set of general principles or rules which are said to govern the way in which equity operates. They tend to illustrate the qualities of equity, in contrast to the common law, as a more flexible, responsive approach to the needs of the individual, inclined to take into account the parties' conduct and worthiness. They were developed by the English Court of Chancery and other courts that administer equity jurisdiction, including the law of trusts. Although the most fundamental and time honored of the maxims, listed on this page, are often referred to on their own as the 'maxims of equity' or 'the equitable maxims',The first equitable maxim is 'equity delights in equality' or equity is equality Like other kinds of legal maxims or principles, they were originally, and sometimes still are, expressed in Latin.

Role of maxims
Maxims of equity are not a rigid set of rules, but are, rather, general principles which can be derived from in specific cases. Snell's Equity, an English treatise, takes the view that the "Maxims do not cover the whole ground, and moreover they overlap, one maxim contains by implication what belongs to another. Indeed it would not be difficult to reduce all under two: 'Equity will not suffer a wrong to be without a remedy' and 'Equity acts on the person'".

Jeffrey Hackney has argued that maxims are more harmful than helpful in understanding equitable principles:
Apart from a vigorous life in law examinations at the pen of weaker candidates, most maxims do not today greatly figure in judicial language, and their principal harm is, by their banality, to reduce manifestations of justice to the level of simple chatter, and thereby to devalue the underlying conscience.

List of maxims

Equity looks on that as done which ought to have been done
Sometimes phrased as "equity regards as done what should have been done", this maxim means that when individuals are required, by their agreements or by law, to perform some act of legal significance, equity will regard that act as having been done as it ought to have been done, even before it has actually happened. This makes possible the legal phenomenon of equitable conversion.

The consequences of this maxim, and of equitable conversion, are significant in their bearing on the risk of loss in transactions. When parties enter a contract for a sale of real property, the buyer is deemed to have obtained an equitable right that becomes a legal right only after the deal is completed. (For an English example, see Walsh v Lonsdale.)

Due to his equitable interest in the outcome of the transaction, the buyer who suffers a breach may be entitled to the equitable remedy of specific performance (although not always, see below).  If he is successful in seeking a remedy at law, he is entitled to the value of the property at the time of breach regardless of whether it has appreciated or depreciated.

The fact that the buyer may be forced to suffer a depreciation in the value of the property means that he bears the risk of loss if, for example, the improvements on the property he bought burn down while he is still in escrow.

Problems may sometimes arise because, through some lapse or omission, insurance coverage is not in force at the time a claim is made. If the policyholder has clearly been at fault in this connection, because, for example, he has not paid premiums when he should have, then it will normally be quite reasonable for an insurer to decline to meet the claim. However, it gets more difficult if the policyholder is no more at fault than the insurer. The fair solution in the circumstances may be arrived at by applying the principle that equity regards that as done that ought to be done. In other words, what would the position have been if what should have been done had been done?

Thus, we know in one case, premiums on a life insurance policy were overdue. The insurer's letter to the policyholder warning him of this fact was never received by the policyholder, who died shortly after the policy consequently lapsed. It was clear that if the notice had been received by the policyholder, he or his wife would have taken steps to ensure the policy continued in force, because the policyholder was terminally ill at the time and the coverage provided by the policy was something his wife was plainly going to require in the foreseeable future. Since the policyholder would have been fully entitled to pay the outstanding premium at that stage, regardless of his physical condition, the insurer (with some persuasion from the Bureau) agreed that the matter should be dealt with as if the policyholder had done so. In other words, his widow was entitled to the sum assured less the outstanding premium. In other similar cases, however, it has not been possible to follow the same principle because there has not been sufficiently clear evidence that the policy would have been renewed.

Another illustration of the application of this equitable principle was in connection with motor vehicle insurance. A policyholder was provided with coverage on the basis that she was entitled to a "no claims" discount from her previous insurer. Confirmation to this effect from the previous insurer was required. When that was not forthcoming, her coverage was cancelled by the brokers who had issued the initial coverage note. This was done without reference to the insurer concerned whose normal practice in such circumstances would have been to maintain coverage and to require payment of the full premium until proof of the no claims discount was forthcoming. Such proof was eventually obtained by the policyholder, but only after she had been involved in an accident after the cancellation by the brokers of the policy. Here again, the fair outcome was to look at what would have happened if the insurer's normal practice had been followed. In such circumstances, the policyholder would plainly have still had a policy at the time of the accident. The insurer itself had not acted incorrectly at any stage. However, in the circumstances, it was equitable for it to meet the claim.

Equity will not suffer a wrong to be without a remedy
When seeking an equitable relief, the one that has been wronged has the stronger hand. The stronger hand is the one that has the capacity to ask for a legal remedy (judicial relief). In equity, this form of remedy is usually one of specific performance or an injunction (injunctive relief). These are superior remedies to those administered at common law such as damages. The Latin legal maxim is ubi jus ibi remedium ("where there is a right there must be a remedy").

The maxim is necessarily subordinate to positive principles and cannot be applied either to subvert established rules of law or to give the courts a jurisdiction hitherto unknown, and it is only in a general not in a literal sense that the maxim has force.

Case law dealing with the principle of this maxim at law include Ashby v White (K.B. 1703) and Bivens v. Six Unknown Named Agents (U.S. 1971). The application of this principle at law was important to the decision of Marbury v. Madison, wherein it was invoked to establish that Marbury had a cause of action to his commission in the first place in order for Chief Justice Marshall to make his more wide-ranging decision. The United States' Bivens doctrine, however, has been sharply limited over time, such as in Egbert v. Boule (U.S. 2022),  in favor of requiring causes of action to be explicitly authorized by statute.

Equity will not allow a wrongdoer to profit by a wrong
This principle is the basis for much of the law of restitution. In Jehon v Vivian (1876) Law Rep. 6 Ch. App. 742, Lord Chancellor Hatherley stated that “this court never allows a man to make profit by a wrong.” 

The U.S. Supreme Court likewise stated in Root v. Railway Company (1881) that “it would be inequitable that [a wrongdoer] should make a profit out of his own wrong.” In Liu v. Securities and Exchange Commission (2020), the Supreme Court called this a “foundational principle.”

Equity does not punish 

Lord Justice James stated in Vyse v. Foster (Ch.App. 1871) that “This Court is not a Court of penal jurisdiction. It compels restitution of property unconscientiously withheld; it gives full compensation for any loss or damage through failure of some equitable duty; but it has no power of punishing anyone."

This is largely because equity is civil in nature, and not criminal. Criminal equity formerly existed in the infamous Star Chamber, but ceased to exist when that court was abolished. As such, equity generally will not enjoin a crime — nor enjoin a criminal proceeding. As stated in Mayor of York v. Pilkington (Ch. 1742), the Court of Chancery “has not originally, and strictly, any restraining power over criminal prosecutions”.

This maxim means that punitive or exemplary damages are generally not available in equity — at least historically. The U.S. Supreme Court reiterated this principle as a limit on restitution in Liu v. Securities and Exchange Commission (2020), citing the “equitable principle that the wrongdoer should not be punished by ‘pay[ing] more than a fair compensation to the person wronged.’ Tilghman v. Proctor, 125 U.S. 136, 145–146 (1888).”

Indeed, equity may step in to block contract terms that create penal damages. This also relates to the maxim that “equity abhors a forfeiture” (see below). However, in many jurisdictions equity will not block an in terrorem clause in a will (stating that beneficiaries who challenge the will forfeit whatever was left for them).

Equity is a sort of equality
Aequitas est quasi aequalitas
Where two persons have an equal right, the property will be divided equally. 

This maxim flows from the fundamental notion of equality or impartiality due to the conception of Equity and is the source of many equitable doctrines. The maxim is of very wide application. The rule of ordinary law may give one party an advantage over the other. But the court of equity, where it can, puts the litigating parties on a footing of equality. Equity proceeds in the principle that a right or liability should as far as possible be equalized among all interested.
In other words, two parties have equal right in any property, so it is distributed equally as per the concerned law.

One who seeks equity must do equity
To receive equitable relief, the petitioning party must be willing to complete all of its own obligations as well. The applicant to a court of equity is just as much subject to the power of that court as the defendant. This maxim may also overlap with the clean hands maxim (see below).

Delay defeats Equity, or Equity aids the vigilant not the indolent
Vigilantibus non dormientibus aequitas subvenit.

A person who has been wronged must act relatively swiftly to preserve their rights. Otherwise, they are guilty of laches, an untoward delay in litigation with the presumed intent of denying claims.  This differs from a statute of limitations, in that a delay is particularized to individual situations, rather than a general prescribed legal amount of time.  In addition, even where a limitation period has not yet run, laches may still occur.  The equitable rule of laches and acquiescence was first introduced in Chief Young Dede v. African Association Ltd.

Alternatives:
Delay defeats equity
Equity aids the vigilant, not those who sleep on their rights

Equity imputes an intention to fulfil an obligation
Generally speaking, near performance of a general obligation will be treated as sufficient unless the law requires perfect performance, such as in the exercise of an option. Text writers give an example of a debtor leaving a legacy to his creditor equal to or greater than his obligation. Equity regards such a gift as performance of the obligation so the creditor cannot claim both the legacy and payment of the debt.
  
Where a claimant is under an obligation to do one thing but does another, his action may be treated as close enough approximation of the required act. A claimant who has undertaken an obligation, will, through his later conduct be interpreted as fulfilment of that obligation.

Equity acts in personam (i.e. on persons rather than on objects)
In England, there was a distinction drawn between the jurisdiction of the law courts and that of the chancery court. Courts of law had jurisdiction over property as well as persons and their coercive power arose out of their ability to adjust ownership rights. Courts of equity had power over persons. Their coercive power arose from the ability, on authority of the crown, to hold a violator in contempt, and take away his freedom (or money) until he purged himself of his contumacious behavior. This distinction helped preserve a separation of powers between the two courts.

Nevertheless, courts of equity also developed a doctrine that an applicant must assert a "property interest". This was a limitation on their own power to issue relief. This does not mean that the courts of equity had taken jurisdiction over property. Rather, it means that they came to require that the applicant assert a right of some significant substance as opposed to a claim for relief based on an injury to mere emotional or dignitary interests.

Equity abhors a forfeiture
Today, a mortgagor refers to his interest in the property as his "equity". The origin of the concept, however, was actually a mirror-image of the current practice.

At common law, a mortgage was a conveyance of the property, with a condition subsequent, that if the grantor paid the secured indebtedness to the grantee on or before a date certain (the "law" day) then the condition subsequent would be void, otherwise to remain in full force and effect. As was inevitable, debtors would be unable to pay on the law day, and if they tendered the debt after the time had passed, the creditor owed no duty to give the land back. So then the debtor would run to the court of equity, plead that there was an unconscionable forfeiture about to occur, and beg the court to grant an equitable decree requiring the lender to surrender the property upon payment of the secured debt with interest to date. And the equity courts granted these petitions quite regularly and often without regard for the amount of time that had lapsed since the law day had passed. The lender could interpose a defense of laches, saying that so much time had gone by (and so much improvement and betterment had taken place) that it would be inequitable to require undoing the finality of the mortgage conveyance. Other defenses, including equitable estoppel, were used to bar redemption as well.

This unsettling system had a negative impact on the willingness of lenders to accept real estate as collateral security for loans. Since a lender could not re-sell the property until it had been in uncontested possession for years, or unless it could show changed circumstances, the value of real estate collateral was significantly impaired. Impaired, that is, until lawyers concocted the bill of foreclosure, whereby a mortgagee could request a decree that unless the mortgagor paid the debt by a date certain (and after the law date set in the mortgage), the mortgagor would thereafter be barred and foreclosed of all right, title and equity of redemption in and to the mortgaged premises.

To complete the circle, one needs to understand that when a mortgagor fails to pay an installment when due, and the mortgagee accelerates the mortgage, requiring immediate repayment of the entire mortgage indebtedness, the mortgagor does not have a right to pay the past-due installment(s) and have the mortgage reinstated. In Graf v. Hope Building Corp., the New York Court of Appeals observed that in such a case, there was no forfeiture, only the operation of a clause fair on its face, to which the mortgagor had freely assented. In the latter 20th Century, New York's lower courts eroded the Graf doctrine to such a degree that it appears that it is no longer the law, and that a court of conscience has the power to mandate that a default be excused if it is equitable to do so. Of course, now that the pendulum is swinging in the opposite direction, we can expect courts to explain where the limits on the newly expanded equity of redemption lie...and it is probably not a coincidence that the cases that have eroded Graf v. Hope Building Corp. have been accompanied by the rise of arbitration as a means for enforcing mortgages.

Equity does not require an idle gesture
Also: Equity will not compel a court to do a vain and useless thing. It would be an idle gesture for the court to grant reformation of a contract and then to deny to the prevailing party an opportunity to perform it as modified.

He who comes into equity must come with clean hands
It is often stated that one who comes into equity must come with clean hands (or alternatively, equity will not permit a party to profit by his own wrong). In other words, if you ask for help about the actions of someone else but have acted wrongly, then you do not have clean hands and you may not receive the help you seek. For example, if you desire your tenant to vacate, you must have not violated the tenant's rights.

However, the requirement of clean hands does not mean that a "bad person" cannot obtain the aid of equity. "Equity does not demand that its suitors shall have led blameless lives." The defense of unclean hands only applies if there is a nexus between the applicant's wrongful act and the rights he wishes to enforce.

In D & C Builders Ltd v Rees, a small building firm did some work on the house of a couple named Rees. The bill came to £732, of which the Rees had already paid £250. When the builders asked for the balance of £482, the Rees announced that the work was defective, and they were only prepared to pay £300.  As the builders were in serious financial difficulties (as the Rees knew), they reluctantly accepted the £300 "in completion of the account". The decision to accept the money would not normally be binding in contract law, and afterwards the builders sued the Rees for the outstanding amount. The Rees claimed that the court should apply the doctrine of promissory estoppel, which can make promises binding even when unsupported by consideration. However, Lord Denning refused to apply the doctrine, on the grounds that the Rees had taken unfair advantage of the builders' financial difficulties, and therefore had not come "with clean hands".

Equity delights to do justice and not by halves
When a court of equity is presented with a good claim to equitable relief, and it is clear that the plaintiff also sustained monetary damages, the court of equity has jurisdiction to render legal relief, e.g., monetary damages. Hence equity does not stop at granting equitable relief, but goes on to render a full and complete collection of remedies.

Equity will take jurisdiction to avoid a multiplicity of suits
Thus, "where a court of equity has all the parties before it, it will adjudicate upon all of the rights of the parties connected with the subject matter of the action, so as to avoid a multiplicity of suits." This is the basis for the procedures of interpleader, class action, and the more rarely used Bill of Peace.

Equity follows the laws
This maxim, also expressed as Aequitas sequitur legem, means more fully that "equity will not allow a remedy that is contrary to law."

The Court of Chancery never claimed to override the courts of common law. Story states "where a rule, either of the common or the statute law is direct, and governs the case with all its circumstances, or the particular point, a court of equity is as much bound by it as a court of law, and can as little justify a departure from it." According to Edmund Henry Turner Snell,  “It is only when there is some important circumstance disregarded by the common law rules that equity interferes.” Cardozo wrote in his dissent in Graf v. Hope Building Corporation, 254 N.Y 1 at 9 (1930), "Equity works as a supplement for law and does not supersede the prevailing law."

Maitland says, “We ought not to think of common law and equity as of two rival systems." "Equity had come not to destroy the law, but to fulfil it. Every jot and every title of law was to be obeyed, but when all this had been done yet something might be needful, something that equity would require."The goal of law and equity was the same but due to historical reasons they chose a different path.  Equity respected every word of law and every right at law but where the law was defective, in those cases, equity provides equitable right and remedies.

In modern-day England and Wales, this maxim no longer applies; as per section 49(1) of the Senior Courts Act 1981, the law follows equity instead:

Subject to the provisions of this or any other Act, every court exercising jurisdiction in England or Wales in any civil cause or matter shall continue to administer law and equity on the basis that, wherever there is any conflict or variance between the rules of equity and the rules of the common law with reference to the same matter, the rules of equity shall prevail.

Equity will not assist a volunteer 
A volunteer is defined in equity as one who has not offered consideration for a benefit they have received or expect to receive.  For example, if a person A expects from past conversations and friendship to receive property under any will of person B, but person B dies before writing this into their will, person A, having not made any contribution to person B, will not be able to seek equity's aid. 

This maxim is very important in restitution. Restitution developed as a series of writs called special assumpsit, which were later additions in the courts of law, and were more flexible tools of recovery, based on equity. Restitution could provide means of recovery when people bestowed benefits on one another (such as giving money or providing services) according to contracts that would have been legally unenforceable.

However, pursuant to the equitable maxim, restitution does not allow a volunteer or "officious intermeddler" to recover. 

Those successfully pleading benefit from an estoppel (promise relied on to their detriment) will not be considered volunteers for the purpose of this maxim.

Equity will not complete an imperfect gift
If a donor has failed to fulfil all the required legal formalities to effect a transfer, meaning the gift is an imperfect gift, equity will not act to provide assistance to the donee. This maxim is a subset of equity will not assist a volunteer.

However, there are certain relaxations to the maxim, including the rule of Re Rose of where the donor has “done all in his power to divest himself of and to transfer” the property, and the more recent but controversial use of unconscionability as a method of dispensing a formality requirement.

Note the exception in Strong v Bird (1874) LR 18 Eq 315. If the donor appoints the intended donee as executor of his/her will, and the donor subsequently dies, equity will perfect the imperfect gift.

Where equities are equal, the law will prevail
Equity will provide no specific remedies where the parties' causes are to be seen to be equal, or where neither has been wronged.

The significance of this maxim is that applicants to the chancellors often did so because of the formal pleading of the law courts, and the lack of flexibility they offered to litigants. Law courts and legislature, as lawmakers, through the limits of the substantive law they had created, thus inculcated a certain status quo that affected private conduct, and private ordering of disputes. Equity could alter that status quo, ignoring the clearly imposed limits of legal relief, or legal defences. But courts applying equity are reluctant to do so. This maxim reflects this. If the law firmly denied a cause of action or suggested equities between the parties were as a matter of policy equal, equity would provide no relief; if the law did provide relief, then the applicant would be obligated to bring a legal, rather than equitable action. This maxim overlaps with the previously mentioned "equity follows the law."

Equity will not allow a statute to be used as a cloak for fraud
Equity prevents a party from relying upon a presence or absence of a statutory formality if to do so would be unconscionable and unfair. This can occur in secret trusts and constructive trusts.

Equity will not allow a trust to fail for want of a trustee
If there is no trustee, whoever has legal title to the trust property will be considered the trustee.

Equity regards the beneficiary as the true owner
Due to limits in old Common Law, no remedy was had for beneficiaries if, for example, a trustee ran off with the trust property. To remedy this and protect intended recipients of trust property, Equity regarded the beneficiary as the true (eventual) owners of the trust property.

Between equal equities the first in order of time shall prevail
Comparing timing with legal and equitable claims, “[u]nder the common law, an earlier claim had priority over a later claim if both claims were legal claims . . . The same was true if both claims were equitable . . . [order in time] only mattered under the common law where [one party] had a legal claim and a competing earlier claim to the property was purely equitable.”

See also
Brocard (law)
English trusts law
Legal maxim
List of legal Latin terms

Notes

References
J Martin, Hanbury and Martin's Modern Equity (19th edn Sweet and Maxwell 2012) ch 1
 
Henry R. Gibson, A.M., LL.D. Suits in Chancery: Setting forth the Principles, Pleadings, Practice, Proofs and Processes of The Jurisprudence of Equity (1907 Gaut-Ogden Co., Knoxville, Tenn.) (https://archive.org/details/cu31924084259872)

Equity (law)
Legal doctrines and principles
Legal history of England